Half-Life is a 1998 first-person shooter (FPS) game developed by Valve and published by Sierra Studios for Windows. It was Valve's debut product and the first game in the Half-Life series. Players assume the role of Gordon Freeman, a scientist who must escape the Black Mesa Research Facility after it is invaded by aliens. The gameplay consists of combat, exploration, and puzzle-solving.

Valve was disappointed with the lack of innovation in the FPS genre, and aimed to create an immersive world rather than a "shooting gallery". Unlike other games of the time, the player has almost uninterrupted control of the player character, and the story is told mostly in scripted sequences rather than cutscenes. Valve developed it using GoldSrc, a heavily modified version of the Quake engine, licensed from id Software. The science fiction novelist Marc Laidlaw was hired to shape the story and assist with design.

Half-Life received acclaim for its graphics, gameplay and narrative, and won more than 50 PC "Game of the Year" awards. It is considered one of the most influential FPS games and one of the greatest video games ever made. By 2008, it had sold more than nine million copies. It was followed by the expansion packs Opposing Force (1999) and Blue Shift (2001), developed by Gearbox Software. It was ported to the PlayStation 2 in 2001, along with the multiplayer expansion Decay, and to OS X and Linux in 2013. Valve ported Half-Life to its Source engine as Half-Life: Source in 2004. In 2020, Crowbar Collective released an unofficial remake, Black Mesa.

Half-Life inspired numerous fan-made mods, some of which became standalone games, such as Counter-Strike, Day of Defeat and Sven Co-op. It was followed by Half-Life 2 (2004), Half-Life 2: Episode One (2006), Half-Life 2: Episode Two (2007) and Half-Life: Alyx (2020).

Gameplay 

Half-Life is a first-person shooter (FPS) that requires the player to perform combat tasks and puzzle solving to advance through the game. Unlike most of its peers at the time, Half-Life uses scripted sequences, such as a Vortigaunt ramming down a door, to advance major plot points. Compared to most first-person shooters of the time, which relied on cut-scene intermissions to detail their plotlines, Half-Lifes story is told mostly using scripted sequences (bar one short cutscene), keeping the player in control of the first-person viewpoint. In line with this, the player rarely loses the ability to control the player character, who never speaks and is never actually seen in the game; the player sees "through his eyes" for the entire length of the game. Half-Life has no levels; it instead divides the game into chapters, whose titles briefly appear on screen as the player progresses through the game. Progress through the world is continuous, (except for short loading pauses) with each map of the game connecting directly to the next, with the exception of levels involving Teleportation.

The game regularly integrates puzzles, such as navigating a maze of conveyor belts or using nearby boxes to build a small staircase to the next area the player must travel to. Some puzzles involve using the environment to kill an enemy, like turning a valve to spray hot steam at their enemies. There are few bosses in the conventional sense, where the player defeats a superior opponent by direct confrontation. Instead, such organisms occasionally define chapters, and the player is generally expected to use the terrain, rather than firepower, to kill the boss. Late in the game, the player receives a "long jump module" for the HEV suit, which allows the player to increase the horizontal distance and speed of jumps by crouching before jumping. The player must rely on this ability to navigate various platformer-style jumping puzzles in Xen toward the end of the game.

For the most part, the player battles through the game alone, but is occasionally assisted by non-player characters; specifically security guards and scientists who help the player; the guards will fight alongside the player, and both guards and scientists can assist in reaching new areas and impart relevant plot information. An array of alien enemies populate the game, including headcrabs, bullsquids, and headcrab zombies. The player also faces human opponents including the Hazardous Environment Combat Unit (HECU) Marines and Black Ops assassins.

Half-Life includes online multiplayer support for both individual and team-based deathmatch modes.

Plot 
Theoretical physicist Gordon Freeman arrives late for work at the Black Mesa Research Facility. As part of an experiment, he pushes an unusual crystal of alien origin into a machine, called the anti-mass spectrometer, for analysis. The spectrometer explodes, creating a "resonance cascade" that severely damages the facility and opens a portal to another dimension, Xen. Surviving scientists urge Gordon to head to the surface, where he defends himself against hostile Xen creatures and the HECU (Hazardous Environment Combat Unit), a special unit of United States Marine Corps sent to cover up the incident by killing all of the hostile aliens and any Black Mesa personnel they find.

Heading to the surface, Gordon learns that scientists from the Lambda Complex may have found a way to close the portal. Gordon travels to the other end of the facility to assist them. Along the way, he activates a rocket engine test facility to destroy a giant tentacled creature and uses a disused railway system to reach and launch a satellite rocket, with the purpose of attempting to close the portal via satellite, which ultimately fails. After he is captured by the marines and left for dead in a garbage compactor, he escapes and makes his way to an older part of the facility. There, he discovers Xen specimens collected before the incident. Overwhelmed by the alien forces, the HECU Marines pull out of Black Mesa and begin airstrikes. Scaling cliffs, navigating destroyed buildings, and traversing through underground water channels, Gordon arrives at the Lambda Complex, where scientists learn the portal is being forced open on the other side by a mighty entity. They have developed teleportation technology that allows Gordon to travel to Xen, where he is tasked to stop the entity.

In Xen, Gordon encounters the remains of researchers who ventured there before him and Gordon defeats the Gonarch, a huge egg-laying headcrab. At an alien factory manufacturing alien soldiers, he enters a portal that sends him to a vast cave. There, Gordon confronts the Nihilanth, the entity maintaining the rift, and destroys it. Gordon is summoned by the mysterious G-Man, who has been watching his progress in Black Mesa and praises him. The G-Man explains his "employers" wish to employ Gordon. If Gordon refuses, he is teleported to an area full of alien soldiers to be killed immediately. If Gordon accepts, the G-Man congratulates him and places him into stasis to await his next assignment.

Development 

Valve, based in Kirkland, Washington, was founded in 1996 by the former Microsoft employees Mike Harrington and Gabe Newell. For its first product, Valve settled on a concept for a horror first-person shooter (FPS) game using the Quake engine licensed from id Software. They also licensed the Quake II engine, and combined code from both engines with their own, adding skeletal animation and Direct3D support; Newell estimated that around 75% of the final engine code was by Valve. As the project expanded, Valve cancelled development of a fantasy role-playing game, Prospero, and the Prospero team joined the Half-Life project.

Half-Life was inspired by FPS games Doom (1993) and Quake (1996), Stephen King's 1980 novella The Mist, and a 1963 episode of The Outer Limits titled "The Borderland". According to the designer Harry Teasley, Doom was a major influence, and the team wanted Half-Life to "scare you like Doom did". The project had the working title Quiver, after the Arrowhead military base from The Mist. The name Half-Life was chosen because it was evocative of the theme, not clichéd, and had a corresponding visual symbol: the Greek letter λ (lower-case lambda), which represents the decay constant in the half-life equation. According to designer Brett Johnson, the level design was inspired by environments in the manga series Akira.

Valve struggled to find a publisher, as many believed the game was too ambitious for a first-time developer. Sierra On-Line signed Valve for a one-game deal as it was interested in making a 3D action game, especially one based on the Quake engine. Valve first showed Half-Life in early 1997; it was a success at E3 that year, where Valve demonstrated the animation and artificial intelligence. Novel features of the artificial intelligence included fear and pack behavior.

Valve aimed for a November 1997 release to compete with Quake II. By September 1997, the team found that while they had built some innovative aspects in weapons, enemies, and level design, the game was not fun and there was little design cohesion. The company postponed the release and reworked every level. They took a novel approach of assigning a small team to build a prototype level containing every element in the game and then spent a month iterating on the level. When the rest of the team played the level, which the designer Ken Birdwell described as "Die Hard meets Evil Dead", they agreed to use it as a baseline. The team developed three theories about what made the level fun. First, it had several interesting things happen in it, all triggered by the player rather than a timer so that the player would set the pace of the level. Second, the level responded to any player action, even for something as simple as adding graphic decals to wall textures to show a bullet impact. Finally, the level warned the player of imminent danger to allow them to avoid it, rather than killing the player with no warning.

To move forward with this unified design, Valve sought a game designer but found no one suitable. Instead, Valve created the "cabal", initially a group of six individuals from across all departments that worked primarily for six months straight in six-hour meetings four days a week. The cabal was responsible for all elements of design, including level layouts, key events, enemy designs, narrative, and the introduction of gameplay elements relative to the story. The collaboration proved successful, and once the cabal had come to decisions on types of gameplay elements that would be needed, mini-cabals from other departments most affected by the choice were formed to implement these elements. Membership in the main cabal rotated since the required commitment created burnout.

The cabal produced a 200-page design document detailing nearly every aspect of the game. They also produced a 30-page document for the narrative, and hired the science fiction novelist Marc Laidlaw to help manage the script. Laidlaw said his contribution was to add "old storytelling tricks" to the team's ambitious designs: "I was in awe of [the team]. It felt to me like I was just borrowing from old standards while they were the ones doing something truly new." Rather than dictate narrative elements "from some kind of ivory tower of authorial inspiration", he worked with the team to improvise ideas, and was inspired by their experiments. For example, he conceived the opening train ride after an engineer implemented train code for another concept.

Valve initially planned to use traditional cutscenes, but switched to a continuous first-person perspective for lack of time. Laidlaw said they discovered unexpected advantages in this approach, as it created a sense of immersion and enforced a sense of loneliness in a frightening environment. Laidlaw felt that non-player characters were unnecessary to guide players if the design had sufficiently strong "visual grammar", and that this allowed the characters to "feel like characters instead of signposts". An early version of Half-Life began immediately after the disaster, with the environments already wrecked. Laidlaw worked with Johnson to create versions of the lab environment before the disaster to help set the story. He said: "These were all economical ways of doing storytelling with the architecture — which was my whole obsession. The narrative had to be baked into the corridors."

Within a month of the cabal's formation, the other team members started detailed game development, and within another month began playtesting through Sierra. The cabal was intimately involved with playtesting, monitoring the player but otherwise not interacting. They noted any confusion or inability to solve a game's puzzles and made them into action items to be fixed on the next iteration. Later, with most of the main adjustments made, the team included means to benchmark players' actions. They then collected and interpreted statistically to fine-tune levels further. Between the cabal and playtesting, Valve identified and removed parts that proved unenjoyable. Birdwell said that while there were struggles at first, the cabal approach was critical for Half-Lifes success, and was reused for Team Fortress 2 from the start.

Much of the detail of Half-Life development has been lost. According to the Valve employee Erik Johnson, two or three months before release, their Visual SourceSafe source control system "exploded". Logs of technical changes from before the final month of development were lost, and code had to be recovered from individual computers.

Mods 
Half-Life saw fervent support from independent game developers, due in no small part to support and encouragement from Valve. Worldcraft, the level-design tool used during the game's development, was included with the game software. Printed materials accompanying the game indicated Worldcraft's eventual release as a retail product, but those plans never materialized. Valve also released a software development kit, enabling developers to modify the game and create mods. Both tools were significantly updated with the release of the version 1.1.0.0 patch. Supporting tools (including texture editors, model editors, and level editors such as the multiple engine editor QuArK) were either created or updated to work with Half-Life.

The Half-Life software development kit served as the development base for many mods, including the Valve-developed Team Fortress Classic and Deathmatch Classic (a remake of Quakes multiplayer deathmatch mode in the GoldSrc engine). Other mods such as Counter-Strike and Day of Defeat (DOD) began life as the work of independent developers who later received aid from Valve. Other multiplayer mods include Action Half-Life, Firearms, Science and Industry, The Specialists, Pirates, Vikings and Knights, Natural Selection and Sven Co-op.

Numerous single-player mods have also been created, include USS Darkstar (1999, a futuristic action-adventure on board a zoological research spaceship), They Hunger (2000–2001, a survival horror total conversion trilogy involving zombies), Poke646 (2001, a follow-up to the original Half-Life story with improved graphics), and Someplace Else (2002, a side-story to the original Half-Life).

In 2003, Valve's network was infiltrated by hackers. Among the stolen files were the unreleased Half-Life modification Half-Life: Threewave, a canceled remake of the mod Threewave CTF from Quake. The files were later found by independent reporter Tyler McVicker of Valve News Network on a Vietnamese FTP server in February 2016, and were unofficially released in September 2016.

Some Half-Life modifications received retail releases. Counter-Strike was the most successful, having been released in six different editions: as a standalone product (2000), as part of the Platinum Pack (2000), as an Xbox version (2003), and as a single-player spin-off, Counter-Strike: Condition Zero (2004), as well as in two versions using the Source engine. Team Fortress Classic, Day of Defeat, Gunman Chronicles (2000, a futuristic Western movie-style total conversion with emphasis on its single-player mode) and Sven Co-op were also released as standalone products. Half-Life is also the subject of the YouTube improv roleplaying series Half-Life VR but the AI is Self-Aware and Freeman's Mind.

Release 
Half-Life was released in November 1998. The revised version of Half-Life shown at E3 1998 was given Game Critics Awards for "Best PC Game" and "Best Action Game". Valve released two demos for Half-Life. The first, Half-Life: Day One, contained the first fifth of the game and was distributed with certain graphic cards. The second demo, Half-Life: Uplink, was released on February 12, 1999, and featured original content. A short film based on Half-Life, also titled Half-Life: Uplink, was developed by Cruise Control, a British marketing agency, and released on February 11, 1999. The film's protagonist is a journalist who infiltrates the Black Mesa Research Facility, trying to discover what has happened there.

Half-Life was censored in Germany to comply with the Federal Department for Media Harmful to Young Persons (BPjM by its German abbreviation), which regulates depictions of violence against humans. Valve replaced the human characters in the game with robots, replacing blood with oil and body parts with gears, among other changes. In 2017, BPjM removed Half-Life from its list; to acknowledge this, Valve released Half-Life Uncensored, a free downloadable content pack, that reverts the censorship.

Ports and remakes 
Captivation Digital Laboratories and Gearbox Software developed a port of Half-Life for the Dreamcast, with new character models and textures and an exclusive expansion, Blue Shift. Following the cancellations of several third-party Dreamcast games in the wake of Sega's decision to discontinue the console in March 2001, Sierra cancelled the port weeks before its scheduled release in June, citing "changing marketing conditions". Blue Shift was ported to Windows. The Dreamcast port became the basis of the Half-Life port for PlayStation 2, released in late 2001. This version added competitive play and a co-op expansion, Half-Life: Decay.

Valve canceled a version of Half-Life for Mac, developed by Logicware, in 2000. Newell said the port was substandard and would have made Mac players "second-class customers". Rebecca Heineman, the co-founder of Logicware, denied this, saying that Valve cancelled the port as Apple had angered them by misrepresenting sales projections. She said the port was complete and three weeks from release. Valve released ports for OS X and Linux in 2013.

In 2004, Valve released Half-Life: Source, a version of Half-Life created in their new game engine, Source. It includes no new graphical elements, but adds new physics, water effects and 5.1 surround sound. Black Mesa, a third-party remake of Half-Life developed by Crowbar Collective in the Source engine, was published as a free mod in September 2012 and later approved by Valve for a commercial release.

Expansions 
Half-Life was followed by an expansion pack, Opposing Force, on November 1, 1999, developed by Gearbox Software. Players control US Marine corporal Adrian Shephard, who fights a new group of aliens and black operations units. Gearbox developed a second expansion pack, Blue Shift, in which players control Barney Calhoun, a security guard at Black Mesa. It was developed as a bonus campaign for the Dreamcast port of Half-Life; but released for Windows on June 12, 2001, after the port was canceled. Gearbox created a cooperative multiplayer expansion pack, Decay, exclusively for the PlayStation 2 port of Half-Life.

Reception

Critical reception

Half-Life has a score of 96 out of 100 on aggregate review website Metacritic. Computer Gaming Worlds Jeff Green said that the game "is not just one of the best games of the year. It's one of the best games of any year, an instant classic that is miles better than any of its immediate competition, and – in its single-player form – is the best shooter since the original Doom". IGN described it as "a tour de force in game design, the definitive single player game in a first-person shooter". GameSpot said it was the "closest thing to a revolutionary step the genre has ever taken".

Next Generation reviewed the PC version of the game, rating it five stars out of five, and stated that "It is fast paced, it is dramatic, and it brings the very idea of adventure on a PC out of the dark ages and into a 3D world. All that and not a single Orc in sight."

Several reviewers cited the level of immersion and interactivity as revolutionary. AllGame said, "It isn't everyday that you come across a game that totally revolutionizes an entire genre, but Half-Life has done just that." Hot Games commented on the realism, and how the environment "all adds up to a totally immersive gaming experience that makes everything else look quite shoddy in comparison". Gamers Depot found the game engaging, stating that they have "yet to play a more immersive game period". The Electric Playground said that Half-Life was an "immersive and engaging entertainment experience", but noted that this only lasted for the first half of the game, explaining that the game "peaked too soon".

The final portion of the game, taking place in the alien world of Xen, was generally considered the weakest. Besides introducing a wholly new and alien setting, it also featured a number of low-gravity jumping puzzles. The GoldSrc engine did not provide as much precise control for the player during jumping, making these jumps difficult and often with Freeman falling into a void and the player restarting the game. Wired Julie Muncy called the Xen sequence "an abbreviated, unpleasant stop on an alien world with bad platforming and a boss fight against what appeared, by all accounts, to be a giant floating infant".

During the 2nd Annual AIAS Interactive Achievement Awards (now known as the D.I.C.E. Awards), Half-Life won the awards for "Computer Game of the Year" and "Computer Action Game of the Year", along with nominations for "Game of the Year", "Outstanding Achievement in Art/Graphics", "Outstanding Achievement in Character or Story Development", "Outstanding Achievement in Interactive Design" and "Outstanding Achievement in Software Engineering".

Jeff Lundrigan reviewed the PlayStation 2 version of the game for Next Generation, rating it three stars out of five, and stated that "It may be getting old, but there's still a surprising amount of life in Half-Life". the PlayStation 2 version of Half-Life was a nominee for The Electric Playgrounds 2001 Blister Awards for "Best Console Shooter Game", but lost to Halo: Combat Evolved for Xbox.

In the November 1999, October 2001, and April 2005 issues of PC Gamer, Half-Life was named the best PC game of all time. In 2004, GameSpy readers voted Half-Life the best game of all time. Gamasutra gave it their Quantum Leap Award in the FPS category in 2006. GameSpot inducted Half-Life into their Greatest Games of All Time list in May 2007. In 2007, IGN described Half-Life as one of the most influential video games, and in 2013 wrote that the history of the FPS genre "breaks down pretty cleanly into pre-Half-Life and post-Half-Life eras". In 2021, the Guardian ranked Half-Life the third-greatest game of the 1990s, writing that it "helped write the rulebook for how games tell their stories without resorting to aping the conventions of film".

Sales
According to Newell, Half-Life was budgeted with the expectation of lifetime sales of around 180,000 copies. However, it was a surprise hit. In the United States, Half-Life debuted at #8 on PC Data's weekly PC game sales chart for the November 15–21 period, with an average retail price (ARP) of $49. It rose to sixth place the following week, before dropping to position 10 for the week ending December 5. During the December 6–12 period, the game climbed back to sixth place; by this time, its ARP had dropped to $36. It placed between sixth and eighth on PC Data's weekly charts through the end of December, and its ARP rose back to $45 by the week ending January 2. PC Data declared Half-Life November's sixth-best-selling PC game in the United States, a position it held for the month of December. While its US sales were below 100,000 copies by November 30, by 1999 it had sold 212,173 copies and earned revenues of $8.6 million in the United States by the end of 1998.

In January 1999, Half-Life debuted at #3 on Chart-Track's PC game sales rankings for the United Kingdom, and remained in PC Data's weekly top 10 for the entire month, peaking at #4. By January 19, after two full months of availability, global sales of Half-Life surpassed 500,000 units. In the United States, it was the fifth-best-selling PC game for the month of January. On PC Data's weekly charts, it rose to #2 from February 7–20, with an ARP of $35. Holding a position in the weekly top 10 for the rest of February, it climbed to fourth for the month. The game remained in PC Data's weekly top 10 until the week of March 21 and dropped to position 11 for March as a whole. In the United Kingdom, it placed second in February—behind the debut of Baldur's Gate—and fifth in March. In April, it claimed #3 on Chart-Track's rankings and dropped to #16 on those of PC Data. On April 23, Sierra announced that global sales of Half-Life had reached almost 1 million copies.

After maintaining the 16th place for May in the US, Half-Life exited PC Data's monthly top 20 in June. Half-Life became the fifth-bestselling PC game of the first half of 1999 in the US. Its domestic sales during 1999 reached 290,000 copies by the end of September. During 1999, it was the fifth-best-selling PC game in the US, with sales of 445,123 copies. These sales brought in revenues of $16.6 million, the sixth-highest gross that year for a PC game in the US. The following year, it was the 16th-bestselling PC game in the US, selling another 286,593 copies and earning $8.98 million.

The PlayStation 2 version received a "Silver" sales award from the Entertainment and Leisure Software Publishers Association (ELSPA), indicating sales of at least 100,000 copies in the United Kingdom. Half-Lifes global sales reached 2.5 million units by July 2001. Edge noted in 2003 that "a significant number of the 7.5m copies of the PC version were bought because the game offered such potential for community-driven expansion". As of November 16, 2004, eight million copies of the game had been sold, by 2008, 9.3 million copies had been sold at retail. Guinness World Records awarded Half-Life the world record for Best-Selling First-Person Shooter of All Time (PC) in the Guinness World Records: Gamer's Edition 2008.

Sequels 
Half-Life 2 was announced at E3 2003 and released in 2004. The player controls Freeman 20 years after the Black Mesa incident in the dystopian City 17, where he joins a rebellion against an alien regime. It was followed by the episodic games Half-Life 2: Episode One (2006) and Half-Life 2: Episode Two (2007). After cancelling several other Half-Life projects, Valve released Half-Life: Alyx in 2020.

Notes

References

External links 
 

1998 video games
Alien invasions in video games
Cancelled classic Mac OS games
Cancelled Dreamcast games
Censored video games
D.I.C.E. Award for Action Game of the Year winners
First-person shooters
Gearbox Software games
GoldSrc games
Half-Life (series)
Interactive Achievement Award winners
Laboratories in fiction
Linux games
MacOS games
Multiplayer online games
Physics in fiction
PlayStation 2 games
Science fiction video games
Sierra Entertainment games
Single-player video games
Teleportation in fiction
Valve Corporation games
Video games developed in the United States
Video games scored by Kelly Bailey
Video games set in New Mexico
Video games set in the 2000s
Video games set in the United States
Video games with alternate endings
Video games with expansion packs
Windows games